The 2020 STCC TCR Scandinavia Touring Car Championship was the tenth overall season of the Scandinavian Touring Car Championship and the fourth under the internationally recognised TCR formula. It was also the third time the championship has run under the STCC TCR Scandinavia Touring Car Championship banner. Originally due to start on 15 May at Ring Knutstorp and end on 4 October at Mantorp Park, the season start was postponed due to the COVID-19 pandemic. A revised calendar was due to be published sometime after Easter.

Robert Dahlgren and Brink Motorsport are the reigning Drivers' and Teams' champions respectively.

Entrants 
The following teams and drivers are set to compete in the 2020 season:

Driver changes 
 2019 V8 Thunder Cars champion Emil Persson is set to join Kågered Racing, alongside championship runner-up Mikael Persson.
 Fredrik Blomstedt, who debuted in the series in 2017, was set to join Brink Motorsport but was forced to leave due to financial difficulties.
 William Nyberg is set to debut with his father's team, TPR Motorsport, at the season opener.
 Robert Huff is set to debut with Lestrup Racing.
 Casper Elgaard is set to debut with TPR Motorsport.
 Isac Aronsson is set to debut with his family team, Isac's Racing.

Team changes 
 Kågered Racing is set to expand their operation to three cars. 
 PWR Racing is set to replace the Cupra León TCR with the Cupra Leon Competición TCR.
 Experion Racing Team is set to replace their Volkswagen Golf GTI TCR with a Hyundai i30 N TCR.

Calendar changes 
 Two rounds are scheduled to be held in Denmark alongside the inaugural season of the TCR Denmark Touring Car Series.
 Anderstorp Raceway was removed from the calendar.
 Bellahøj Park was added to the calendar.
 The opening round at Ring Knutstorp was postponed due to the COVID-19 pandemic.
 A new, four-round, calendar was released on 15 June 2020.

Changes

General changes 
 In October 2019, SNB-Events AB took over as promoter for the series.
 In December 2019, Spring Media took over the distribution rights of the series.
 The independents' cup is set to return. Any driver over the age of 26, that haven't taken part in STCC TCR Scandinavia before, and are driving cars older than three years will be eligible to compete in the cup.

Race calendar and results 
The following 4 rounds are scheduled to take place in 2020:

Championship standings

Drivers' Championship

References

External links 
 

STCC TCR Scandinavia Touring Car Championshopb
STCC TCR Scandinavia Touring Car Championship
STCC